Collection is a greatest hits album by Swedish recording artist Agnes, and was released on 27 December 2013 in Sweden. It includes most of her singles to date, omitting Stranded, Kick Back Relax, All I Want for Christmas Is You, Sometimes I Forget and Life (Diamonds in the Dark).

Så mycket bättre covers
The album will include songs which Agnes performed on the Swedish television show Så mycket bättre, that aired during the autumn and winter of 2013 on TV4. The first single released from the album, and also the first cover from the show was "En Sån Karl".
 Day 1: Lill Lindfors' day - "En sån karl"
 Day 2: Bo Sundström's day - "Allt ljus på mig"
 Day 3: Ken Ring's day - "Nu måste vi dra"
 Day 4: Titiyo's day - "Flowers"
 Day 5: Ulf Dageby's day - "Hanna från Arlöv"
 Day 7: Ebbot Lundberg's day - "Instant Repeater"

Track listing

Charts

Så mycket bättre singles

Release History

References

External links
Official Website
Official U.S. Website
Official German Website

2013 albums
Agnes (singer) albums